Constantin Cojoc (born 30 May 1981) is a Romanian judoka.

Achievements

See also
European Judo Championships
History of martial arts
Judo in Romania
List of judo techniques
List of judoka
Martial arts timeline

References

External links

1981 births
Living people
Romanian male judoka
Place of birth missing (living people)